Play (stylised as PLAY) is a monthly magazine produced by Future plc in the United Kingdom, which reports on Sony's PlayStation product range. It features news, reviews, and previews concerning upcoming PlayStation titles. In addition to being sold in the UK, PLAY is also sold in Australia (as PLAY Australia) and as an import in the United States.

History

Imagine Publishing 
The magazine was first launched in 1995 by Imagine Publishing and was closed in 2016. Before it closed, the magazine had become the UK's longest-running PlayStation magazine. Issue 269, the magazine's final printed edition was published in April 2016 when it become a digital only publication for a short time. Prior to issue 249, PLAY came with a covermounted DVD every issue.

Future plc 
Future plc acquired Imagine Publishing and its brands in 2016. In May 2021, the PLAY brand was resurrected as a replacement for PlayStation Official Magazine UK. The numbering was reset and the staff were retained from PlayStation Official Magazine UK.

The relaunched magazine is part of GamesRadar+.

References

External links
Official website
Imagine Publishing website
Play UK magazine overview and publishers' information
Archived Play Magazines on the Internet Archive

1995 establishments in the United Kingdom
2016 disestablishments in the United Kingdom
2021 establishments in England
2021 establishments in the United Kingdom
Computer magazines published in the United Kingdom
Magazines established in 1995
Monthly magazines published in the United Kingdom
PlayStation (brand) magazines
Video game magazines published in the United Kingdom